Cogger's island skink (Geomyersia coggeri) is a species of lizard in the family Scincidae. The species is endemic to the Admiralty Islands.

Etymology
The specific name, coggeri, is in honor of Australian herpetologist Harold Cogger.

Habitat
The preferred natural habitat of G. coggeri is forest, but it has also been found under debris in coconut plantations.

Description
G. coggeri is a small, brown lizard, with a rounded snout. It has four short well-developed legs, with five digits on each foot.

Reproduction
The mode of reproduction of G. coggeri is unknown.

References

Further reading
Adler GH, Austin CC, Dudley R (1995). "Dispersal and speciation of skinks among archipelagos in the tropical Pacific Ocean". Evolutionary Ecology 9: 529–541.
Greer AE (1982). "A New Species of Geomyersia (Scincidae) from the Admiralty Islands, with a Summary of the Genus". Journal of Herpetology 16 (1): 61–66. (Geomyersia coggeri, new species).

Geomyersia
Reptiles described in 1982
Reptiles of Papua New Guinea
Endemic fauna of Papua New Guinea
Taxa named by Allen Eddy Greer
Skinks of New Guinea